The 21st Annual European Film Awards took place on 6 December 2008 in Copenhagen, Denmark.

Winners and nominees

Best European Actor
  Toni Servillo – Gomorrah (Gomorra) and Il Divo
 Michael Fassbender – Hunger
 Thure Lindhardt and Mads Mikkelsen –  Flame & Citron (Flammen & Citronen)
 James McAvoy – Atonement
 Jürgen Vogel – The Wave (Die Welle)
 Elmar Wepper – Cherry Blossoms (Kirschblüten – Hanami)

Best European Actress
  Kristin Scott Thomas – I've Loved You So Long (Il y a longtemps que je t'aime)
 Hiam Abbass – Lemon Tree
 Arta Dobroshi – The Silence of Lorna (Le silence de Lorna)
 Sally Hawkins – Happy-Go-Lucky
 Belen Rueda – The Orphanage (El orfanato)
 Ursula Werner – Cloud 9 (Wolke Neun)

Best European Composer
  Max Richter – Waltz with Bashir (Vals im Bashir)
  – Moscow, Belgium (Aanrijding in Moscou)
 Dario Marianelli – Atonement
 Fernando Velázquez – The Orphanage (El orfanato)

Best European Director
  Matteo Garrone – Gomorrah (Gomorra)
 Laurent Cantet – The Class (Entre les murs)
 Andreas Dresen – Cloud 9 (Wolke Neun)
 Ari Folman – Waltz with Bashir (Vals im Bashir)
 Steve McQueen – Hunger
 Paolo Sorrentino – Il Divo

Best European Film

Best European Screenwriter
 Maurizio Braucci, Ugo Chiti, Gianni di Gregorio, Matteo Garrone, Massimo Gaudioso and Roberto Saviano – Gomorrah (Gomorra)
Suha Arraf and Eran Riklis – Lemon Tree
Ari Folman – Waltz with Bashir
Paolo Sorrentino – Il Divo

European Film Awards ceremonies
2008 film awards
Culture in Copenhagen
2008 in Europe